Håkon Jarvis Westergård  (born 24 September 1992) is a Norwegian orienteering competitor.

He won a silver medal in the mixed sprint relay with the Norwegian team at the 2015 World Orienteering Championships in Inverness, with teammates Elise Egseth, Øystein Kvaal Østerbø and Anne Margrethe Hausken.

He competed at the 2016 World Orienteering Championships in Strömstad, where he placed 20th in the sprint final.

References

External links
 
 Hakon Jarvis Westergard at World of O Runners

1992 births
Living people
Norwegian orienteers
Male orienteers
Foot orienteers
World Orienteering Championships medalists
Competitors at the 2017 World Games
21st-century Norwegian people